The 2000–01 Austrian Hockey League season was the 71st season of the Austrian Hockey League, the top level of ice hockey in Austria. 10 teams participated in the league, and EC KAC won the championship.

Regular season

Playoffs

External links
Austrian Ice Hockey Association

Aus
1
Austrian Hockey League seasons